Baseball NL is the provincial governing body for baseball in Newfoundland and Labrador.

References

Sports governing bodies in Newfoundland and Labrador
Baseball governing bodies in Canada